Darnell Tyrick Smith (born 24 March 1999) is an English footballer who most recently played for Barnet.

Career
Smith signed a two-year scholarship with Barnet in 2015. After loan spells at Staines Town and Three Bridges, Smith signed a professional contract with the Bees in April 2017. Smith made his debut for Barnet on 29 August 2017 against AFC Wimbledon in the EFL Trophy. Smith joined Hungerford Town on loan on 10 November 2017. Smith joined Wingate & Finchley on loan in March 2019. He was released by the Bees at the end of the 2018–19 season.

Career statistics

References

External links

1999 births
Living people
English footballers
Association football defenders
Barnet F.C. players
Staines Town F.C. players
Three Bridges F.C. players
Hungerford Town F.C. players
Wingate & Finchley F.C. players
National League (English football) players
Isthmian League players
People from the London Borough of Hackney